The 2003 Mercedes-Benz Cup was a men's tennis tournament played on outdoor hard courts at the Los Angeles Tennis Center in Los Angeles, California in the United States and was part of the International Series of the 2003 ATP Tour. The tournament ran from July 28 through August 3, 2003. Seventh-seeded Wayne Ferreira won the singles title.

Finals

Singles

 Wayne Ferreira defeated  Lleyton Hewitt 6–3, 4–6, 7–5
 It was Ferreira's 2nd title of the year and the 26th of his career.

Doubles

 Jan-Michael Gambill /  Travis Parrott defeated  Joshua Eagle /  Sjeng Schalken 6–4, 3–6, 7–5
 It was Gambill's 2nd title of the year and the 8th of his career. It was Parrott's only title of the year and the 1st of his career.

References

Mercedes-Benz Cup
Mercedes-Benz Cup
Mercedes-Benz Cup
Mercedes-Benz Cup
Mercedes-Benz Cup
Los Angeles Open (tennis)